The Fayum alphabet is an Ancient Greek abecedary inscribed on four copper plates, purportedly found in Fayum, Egypt but made in Cyprus. It may preserve the earliest form of the Greek alphabet. It is the only known Greek abecedary which ends in the letter tau (Τ), as does the ancestral Phoenician alphabet; all other Greek abecedaries have at least the addition of non-Phoenician upsilon (Υ).

See also
History of the Greek alphabet
Dipylon inscription

References

External links
The Schøyen Collection (MS 108 The Earliest Greek Alphabet) photograph of one of the tablets, with history

Ancient Greeks in Egypt
Greek alphabet